Donna-Kay Henry (born 10 November 1990) is an American-raised Jamaican footballer who plays as a midfielder. She was a member of the Jamaica women's national team.

Early life
Henry was born in Kingston, Jamaica and moved to Queens, New York when she was nine years old.

College career
Henry attended the University of Tennessee at Chattanooga on a full athletic scholarship.

Club career
Henry scored in the Icelandic Women's Cup final in 2015 for UMF Selfoss.

International goals
Scores and results list Jamaica's goal tally first

References

1990 births
Living people
Women's association football forwards
Women's association football wingers
Jamaican women's footballers
Jamaica women's international footballers
FC Neunkirch players
Donna-Kay Henry
Donna-Kay Henry
Donna-Kay Henry
Jamaican expatriate women's footballers
Jamaican expatriate sportspeople in Switzerland
Expatriate women's footballers in Switzerland
Jamaican expatriate sportspeople in Iceland
Expatriate women's footballers in Iceland
Jamaican emigrants to the United States
People with acquired American citizenship
American women's soccer players
Sportspeople from Queens, New York
Soccer players from New York City
Chattanooga Mocs women's soccer players
Women's Premier Soccer League Elite players
American expatriate women's soccer players
American expatriate sportspeople in Switzerland
American expatriate sportspeople in Iceland
African-American women's soccer players
21st-century African-American sportspeople
21st-century African-American women